Moon Lake is a lake located in Coahoma County, Mississippi, United States.

The community of Moon Lake is located on the eastern shore.

References

Lakes of Mississippi
Landforms of Coahoma County, Mississippi